is a Japanese composer, musician, and sound producer. He is best known for his work in video games, primarily for the Chrono, Xeno, Shadow Hearts, and Inazuma Eleven franchises, among various others. Mitsuda began composing music for his own games in high school, later attending a music college in Tokyo. While still a student, he was granted an intern position at the game development studio Wolf Team. 

Mitsuda joined Square upon graduation in 1992 and worked there as a sound effects designer for two years before telling Square's vice president Hironobu Sakaguchi he would quit unless he could write music for their games. Shortly after, Sakaguchi assigned him to work on the soundtrack for Chrono Trigger (1995), whose music has since been cited as among the best in video games.

Mitsuda went on to compose for several other games at Square, including Xenogears (1998) and Chrono Cross (1999). He left the company and became independent in 1998. In 2001, he respectively founded his own music production studio and record company, Procyon Studio and Sleigh Bells. Mitsuda has also worked on anime series, films, and television programs.

Biography

Early life
Mitsuda was born in Tokuyama, Japan, on January 21, 1972, and was raised in the Kumage District of Yamaguchi Prefecture. He took piano lessons beginning at the age of five, but was more interested in sports at the time and did not take music seriously, quitting by the age of six. For a while, he wanted to become a professional golfer. By high school, Mitsuda wanted to become a music composer, inspired by Vangelis' Blade Runner and Henry Mancini's The Pink Panther film scores. He became interested in PCs after his father bought him one, which was a rare item at the time. He started to program computer games and compose music for them, as well as take more technically oriented classes.

After high school, Mitsuda decided to leave town and become independent. With encouragement from his father and sister, he moved to Tokyo and enrolled in the Junior College of Music. Despite the school's low prestige, Mitsuda received solid instruction from his professors, most of them practicing musicians who would take Mitsuda to gigs with them to help carry and set up equipment. At the cost of being used for free physical labor, Mitsuda got a first-hand view of the Japanese music world and valuable training both in and out of the classroom. As part of his college course, he was granted an intern position at the game development studio Wolf Team studying under composer Motoi Sakuraba.

During this work experience, with his school term ending, Mitsuda saw an advertisement for a sound producer at Square in a copy of Famitsu magazine at a game company he was visiting. With no clear plans as to what he wanted to do after school, he applied for the position. Mitsuda sent a demo which won him an interview at the game studio. Despite the self-described "disastrous" interview with composer Nobuo Uematsu and sound programmer Minoru Akao, in which he claimed to only want the job as a "stepping stone" in his career and admitted that he had never played many of Square's biggest games, such as the Final Fantasy series, Mitsuda was offered a position on the company's sound team in April 1992.

Career
Although his official job title was as a composer, Mitsuda found himself working more as a sound engineer. Over the next two years, he created sound effects for Hanjuku Hero, Final Fantasy V, The 7th Saga, Secret of Mana, and Romancing SaGa 2. In 1994, realizing that he would never get a chance to move up to a real composition duty without some drastic action and feeling concerned about his low pay, he gave Square's vice president, Hironobu Sakaguchi, an ultimatum: let him compose, or he would quit. Sakaguchi assigned the young musician to the team working on Chrono Trigger, telling him that "after you finish it, maybe your salary will go up". Mitsuda was assigned as the sole composer for the game, in the end creating 54 tracks for the final release. Mitsuda drove himself to work hard on the score, frequently working until he passed out, and would awake with ideas for songs such as the ending theme for the game. He worked himself so hard that he developed stomach ulcers and had to be hospitalized, which led Uematsu to finish the remaining tracks for him.

Chrono Trigger proved a great success, and the soundtrack proved popular with fans. Mitsuda claims that it is his "landmark" title, which "matured" him. He attributes its success with fans to his use of folk and jazz styling, rather than the "semi-orchestral" style popular in game music at the time. Following Chrono Trigger, Mitsuda composed the soundtrack for Front Mission: Gun Hazard, again with Uematsu. According to Uematsu, Mitsuda again worked so much that he eventually defecated blood out of stress and physical problems. Mitsuda worked on three more titles for Square: Tobal No. 1 and Radical Dreamers: Nusumenai Hōseki both in 1996, and Xenogears in 1998, which featured the first ballad in a Square game, the Celtic ending theme "Small Two of Pieces" sung by Joanne Hogg. Mitsuda also during this period produced albums of arranged music of his original scores, creating acid jazz remixes in Chrono Trigger Arranged Version: The Brink of Time and a Celtic arrangement album of Xenogears music, Creid. In July 1998, following up on what he had said in his original interview with the company, Mitsuda left Square to work as a freelance composer, the first of several of Square's composers to do so.

Following his leaving, Mitsuda has only worked on one more original game with Square, composing for 1999's Chrono Cross, the sequel to Chrono Trigger. He has worked on over a dozen games since then, including the spiritual sequel to Xenogears, Xenosaga Episode I: Der Wille zur Macht, and major games such as Shadow Hearts and Luminous Arc. In addition to video games, Mitsuda has composed music for the anime Inazuma Eleven and for the independent album Kirite. On November 22, 2001, Mitsuda formed Procyon Studio as a company to produce his music, along with a record label, Sleigh Bells. The company consisted of only Mitsuda as composer along with a few sound producers for several years but has since expanded to include other composers. Mitsuda and Procyon Studio have also produced more arranged albums, such as Sailing to the World and 2009's Colours of Light, a compilation album of vocal pieces Mitsuda had composed. The studio was also involved in co-designing the KORG DS-10 synthesizer program for the Nintendo DS, and its successor for the Nintendo 3DS, KORG M01D. Mitsuda claims that, for the projects Procyon had been working on in the late 2000s, he was focusing more on working as a music producer for a team of artists rather than just as a composer. Despite that, Mitsuda continued to compose for several notable games in the 2010s, such as the Inazuma Eleven series, Soul Sacrifice, and Valkyria Revolution, with the latter marking his first fully solo game soundtrack in nearly a decade. Around the same time, Mitsuda also began to compose for non-video game media, including several NHK-produced television shows, as well as anime series such as Black Butler and adaptions of Inazuma Eleven. In addition to serving as the lead composer for 2017's Xenoblade Chronicles 2, Mitsuda also was in charge of the game's audio budget, musician booking, schedule management, and music sheet proofreading, for which he claimed was the largest project he ever worked on. He also composed for its expansion pack, Torna – The Golden Country.

Musical style and influences
Mitsuda claims to compose by "just fool[ing] around on my keyboard" and letting the melodies come to him. He also sometimes comes up with songs while asleep, including the ending theme to Chrono Trigger and "Bonds of Sea and Fire" from Xenogears, though his main inspiration is visual items, "paintings or other things". His music is frequently minimalistic, and he has cited Minimalism as an influence. His final battle themes for Chrono Trigger and Xenogears are based on only a few chords each, with the latter containing only two. Mitsuda has listened to a great number of musical genres throughout his life, which he learned from his father, and is especially inspired by jazz music. He is also inspired by Celtic music, and has created two albums of music in that style. His soundtrack for Chrono Trigger also shows the influence of Asian music, including the sounds of Japanese shakuhachi flutes, Indian tabla drums and the sitar. He has cited Maurice Ravel, J.S. Bach, Pyotr Tchaikovsky, Claude Debussy, Robert Schumann, Antonín Dvořák, and Gustav Holst as his favorite Classical composers, claiming that his modern influences are too numerous to name as he listens to so much music.

Mitsuda names his favorite works as the soundtracks to the Chrono series, Xenogears, Xenosaga Episode I, and the original album Kirite, though he also says that all of his soundtracks are "representational works", as they represent who he was as a composer when he made them. His favorite pieces overall are "The Girl Who Closed Her Heart" and "Pain" from Xenosaga Episode I and pieces from Kirite. When he starts to compose a soundtrack, he first takes one month to gather information and artwork about the game world and scenario, so that his music will fit in with the game. He also finds it easier to be inspired if he has a visual representation. Mitsuda claims that he does not save his best work for more popular games, as he tries to compose each piece to correspond to how it is going to be used in a specific game. He also tries to compose good pieces even for games he feels do not live up to them, so that they will be a redeeming point about the game for the players. The majority of his video game soundtracks are for role-playing games, but he likes projects that are different from what he has done before and is interested in working in other genres.

Legacy

Mitsuda's music from Chrono Trigger was first performed live by the Tokyo Symphony Orchestra in 1996 at the Orchestral Game Concert in Tokyo, Japan, and released on an accompanying album. The first symphonic performance of his music outside Japan took place in 2005 at the Symphonic Game Music Concert in Leipzig, Germany when music from Chrono Cross was presented. Mitsuda has arranged versions of music from Trigger and Cross for Play! A Video Game Symphony video game music concerts in 2006. Music from the two games has also been performed in other video game concert tours such as the Video Games Live concert series and in concerts by the Eminence Orchestra. Music written by Yasunori Mitsuda for Chrono Trigger and Chrono Cross made up one fourth of the music of the Symphonic Fantasies concerts in September 2009 at the Kölner Philharmonie which were produced by Thomas Böcker as a part of the Game Concerts series. "Scars of Time" from Chrono Cross was played at the Fantasy Comes Alive concert in Singapore on April 30, 2010.

Mitsuda's music for Xenogears has also sparked fan-made albums; an officially licensed tribute album titled Xenogears Light: An Arranged Album, was published in limited quantities by the fan group OneUp Studios in 2005. The album features 20 tracks arranged from the Xenogears score and performed with acoustic instruments, such as piano, flute, guitar and violin. Another, unofficial album of remixes titled Humans + Gears was produced as a digital album by OverClocked Remix on October 19, 2009, consisting of 33 tracks. Selections of remixes of Mitsuda's work also appear on Japanese remix albums, called Dōjin, and on English remixing websites such as OverClocked Remix. Music from the Chrono Trigger soundtrack has been arranged for the piano and published as sheet music by DOREMI Music Publishing. Sheet music for Chrono Cross tracks arranged for both solo guitar and guitar duets has been released by Procyon Studio.

For the 20th anniversary of Chrono Trigger in 2015, Mitsuda, along with his performing group Millennial Fair, performed songs from the game at the Tokyo Globe in Tokyo, Japan on July 25 and 26. The event, titled "The Brink of Time", included Mitsuda performing on the piano, guitar, and Irish bouzouki. During the event, Mitsuda also announced that the long requested Chrono series arrangement album, entitled To Far Away Times: Chrono Trigger & Chrono Cross Arrangement Album, would be released by Square Enix Music on October 14, 2015.

Works
All works listed below were solely composed by Mitsuda unless otherwise noted.

Video games

Anime and film

Other projects

 Chrono Trigger Arranged Version: The Brink of Time (1995)
 Creid (1998)
 Street Fighter Zero 3 Drama Album (1999) – with Yoshitaka Hirota
 Iizuka Mayumi no MEGA-TON Smile (1999) – with Yoshitaka Hirota
 Biohazard 2 Drama Album: Chiisana Toubousha Sherry (1999) – with Yoshitaka Hirota
 Biohazard 2 Drama Album: Ikiteita Onna Spy Ada (1999) – with Yoshitaka Hirota
 2197 (1999) – with several others
 Ten Plants 2 Childrens Songs (1999) – with several others
 Hopeful Weeds (2000)
 Square Vocal Collection (2001) – with several others
 Hopeful Weeds original sound vol. 002 (2001)
 Hopeful Weeds original sound vol. 003 (2002)
 Sailing to the World (2002)
 Hopeful Weeds original sound vol. 004 (2003)
 Hopeful Weeds original sound vol. 005 (2004)
 Hopeful Weeds original sound vol. 006 (2004)
 Kirite (2005)
 Specter (2005) – with Kazumi Mitome
 Colours of Light (2009)
 Mobile Suit Gundam 00 Voice Actor Single 7 (2010)
 Myth: The Xenogears Orchestral Album (2011) – with Youki Yamamoto, Sachiko Miyano, and Natsumi Kameoka 
 Play for Japan: The Album (2011) – with several others
 NHK-FM Radio Drama "Sabaku no Utahime" (2011)
 INNOCENCE / lasah (2013)
 Kakumeiteki Broadway Shugisha Doumei / Sumire Uesaka (2014) – with several others
 NHK Special "Uchuu Nama Chuukei Suisei Bakuhatsu Taiyoukei no Nazo" (2014)
 NHK Drama "Ride, Ride, Ride" (2014)
 SARAH / Sarah Àlainn (2014) – producer
 Kaji Yuki no Hitorigoto (2015) – opening theme
 MOTHER / lasah (2018) – with several others
 Yasunori Mitsuda & Millennial Fair: Chrono Cross 20th Anniversary Live Tour 2019 Radical Dreamers (2020)

Footnotes

References

External links
  
 Procyon Studio's official website 

1972 births
20th-century Japanese composers
20th-century Japanese male musicians
20th-century Japanese pianists
21st-century Japanese composers
21st-century Japanese male musicians
21st-century Japanese pianists
Anime composers
Freelance musicians
Japanese composers
Japanese male composers
Japanese male pianists
Japanese music arrangers
Japanese pianists
Living people
Musicians from Yamaguchi Prefecture
People from Yamaguchi Prefecture
Japanese sound designers
Square Enix people
Video game composers